Summit View is a census-designated place (CDP) located in Snohomish County, Washington.

Demographics
In 2010, it had a population of 7,236 inhabitants. 3,618 were male. There were also 3,618 female residents.

Geography
Summit View is located at coordinates 47°8'11"N 122°21'7"W.

Education
Three school districts include portions of Summit View: Bethel School District, Franklin Pierce School District, and Puyallup School District.

Most of the Franklin Pierce portion of Summit View is zoned to Collins Elementary School in Clover Creek, while a portion is zoned to Central Avenue Elementary in Summit. All of the Franklin Pierce portions is zoned to Morris E. Ford Middle School in Midland and Franklin Pierce High School in Clover Creek.

References

Census-designated places in Pierce County, Washington